Hans Deppe (12 November 1897 – 23 September 1969) was a German actor and film director.

Filmography

As director

As actor

References

External links
 

1897 births
1969 deaths
German male film actors
German television directors
Male actors from Berlin
Film directors from Berlin
20th-century German male actors